Que Seas Muy Feliz ("May you be very happy") is the fourth album recorded by the Mexican singer Alejandro Fernández. It was produced by Pedro Ramírez. The song "Como Quien Pierde Una Estrella" was the most popular song of its time, with radio stations playing it with an unusual frequency, turning it into a new anthem for the genre. Videos were made for the songs "Como Quien Pierde Una Estrella" and "La Mitad Que Me Faltaba".

Track listing
 "Que Bueno"  – 3:10
 "Que Será De Mí"  – 2:44
 "Llorando Penas"  – 3:09
 "Como Quien Pierde Una Estrella"  – 3:32
 "Ojo Por Ojo"  – 2:26
 "Paso Del Norte"  – 3:04
 "Uno Más"  – 2:22
 "Y Después"  – 2:56
 "Me Recordarás Llorando"  – 2:58
 "La Mitad Que Me Faltaba"  – 3:24
 "Que Seas Muy Feliz"  – 2:45
 "El Potrillo"  – 3:29

Chart performance

Album

Singles

Sales and certifications

References

1995 albums
Alejandro Fernández albums
Columbia Records albums